Love Is Hot, Truth Is Molten is a compilation album from Scottish singer-songwriter Donovan. It was released in Australia on 7 April 1998 (Raven Records 68).

History
In 1998, Raven Records issued a comprehensive overview of Donovan's 1960s material as Love Is Hot, Truth Is Molten.  The album featured many of the songs in true stereo, unique to any Donovan compact disc release up until that time.

Track listing
All tracks by Donovan Leitch, except where noted.

"Catch the Wind" – 2:54
"Colours" – 2:43
"Universal Soldier" (Buffy Sainte-Marie) – 2:12
"Hey Gyp (Dig the Slowness)" – 3:11
"Josie" – 3:24
"Season of the Witch" – 5:00
"Celeste" – 4:09
"Sunshine Superman" – 4:33
"The Trip" – 4:34
"Mellow Yellow" – 3:41
"Superlungs" – 3:15
"Epistle to Dippy" – 3:09
"There Is a Mountain" – 2:34
"Wear Your Love Like Heaven" – 2:24
"Jennifer Juniper" – 2:42
"Poor Cow" – 2:56
"Hurdy Gurdy Man" – 3:15
"Laleña" – 2:59
"Atlantis" – 5:01
"Goo Goo Barabajagal (Love Is Hot)" – 3:18
"To Susan on the West Coast Waiting" – 3:11
"Celia of the Seals" – 3:00
"Cosmic Wheels" – 4:02

References

External links
 Love Is Hot, Truth Is Molten – Donovan Unofficial Site

Albums produced by Mickie Most
1998 compilation albums
Donovan compilation albums